Yuriy Vlasov (born March 15, 1970) is a retired male freestyle swimmer from Ukraine. He competed for his native country at the 1996 Summer Olympics in Atlanta, Georgia, finishing in 11th place in the men's 50 m freestyle event.

External links
 

1970 births
Living people
Ukrainian male swimmers
Ukrainian male freestyle swimmers
Swimmers at the 1996 Summer Olympics
Olympic swimmers of Ukraine